The second season of The Real Housewives of Dallas, an American reality television series, was broadcast on Bravo. It aired from August 14, 2017, until November 13, 2017, and was primarily filmed in Dallas, Texas. Its executive producers are Adam Karpel, Andrew, John Paparazzo, Rich Bye, Samantha Billett and Andy Cohen.

The second season focuses on the lives of Cary Deuber, Stephanie Hollman, LeeAnne Locken, Brandi Redmond, D'Andra Simmons and Kameron Westcott.

Cast
The second season premiered with D’Andra Simmons and Kameron Westcott joining the cast, and Hendra appearing in a guest capacity.

Episodes

References

External links

 

The Real Housewives of Dallas
2017 American television seasons
Television shows set in Dallas